Heike Wedekind née Lätzsch (born 19 December 1973 in Braunschweig, Lower Saxony) is a former field hockey striker from Germany, who won the gold medal with the Women's National Team at the 2004 Summer Olympics in Athens, Greece.

She made her international debut in 1990 at the age of sixteen at the World Cup in Sydney, Australia. After having played in four consecutive Summer Olympics, starting in 1992, Lätzsch retired in 2004, after the Athens Games. In total, she represented Germany in 250 matches.

International senior tournaments
 1990 – World Cup, Sydney (8th place)
 1991 – European Nations Cup, Brussels (2nd place)
 1992 – Summer Olympics, Barcelona (2nd place)
 1994 – World Cup, Dublin (4th place)
 1995 – European Nations Cup, Amstelveen (3rd place)
 1995 – Champions Trophy, Mar del Plata (4th place)
 1995 – Olympic Qualifying Tournament, Cape Town (3rd place)
 1996 – Summer Olympics, Atlanta (6th place)
 1997 – Champions Trophy, Berlin (2nd place)
 1998 – World Cup, Utrecht (3rd place)
 1999 – Champions Trophy, Brisbane (3rd place)
 1999 – European Nations Cup, Cologne (2nd place)
 2000 – Olympic Qualifying Tournament, Milton Keynes (3rd place)
 2000 – Champions Trophy, Amstelveen (2nd place)
 2000 – Summer Olympics, Sydney (7th place)
 2002 – World Cup, Perth (7th place)
 2004 – Olympic Qualifier, Auckland (4th place)
 2004 – Summer Olympics, Athens (1st place)

References

Profile on Hockey Olympia

External links
 

1973 births
Living people
Sportspeople from Braunschweig
German female field hockey players
Olympic field hockey players of Germany
Field hockey players at the 1992 Summer Olympics
Field hockey players at the 1996 Summer Olympics
Field hockey players at the 2000 Summer Olympics
Field hockey players at the 2004 Summer Olympics
Olympic gold medalists for Germany
Olympic silver medalists for Germany
Olympic medalists in field hockey
Medalists at the 1992 Summer Olympics
Medalists at the 2004 Summer Olympics
21st-century German women